Typhoon Kelly, known as Typhoon Oniang in the Philippines, struck Japan during the middle of October 1987. An area of disturbed weather formed along the monsoon trough near Yap on October 6. Although thunderstorm activity was initially displaced from the center, gradual development occurred nevertheless. The disturbance became a tropical depression on October 9, and a tropical storm the next day. While moving generally north-northwest towards Japan, Kelly attained typhoon intensity on October 12. Continuing to intensify, Typhoon Kelly reached its maximum intensity on October 15, but a weakening trend began thereafter. The next day, the typhoon passed over the islands of Shikoku and Honshu. By October 17, Kelly completed its transition into an extratropical cyclone.

Across Japan, the typhoon was responsible for 452 landslides, 20 destroyed bridges, and 165 damaged roads. A total of 216 homes were destroyed, 24,044 houses were flooded, 99 ships were damaged, and 6,802 ha (16,810 acres) of farmland were damaged. The typhoon killed nine and injured seventeen others. Damage amounted to $365.6 million (1987 USD).

Meteorological history

Following multiple outbreaks of tropical cyclone activity across the Western Pacific basin in September 1987, a large ridge developed at unusually low latitudes of the basin, forcing the Intertropical Convergence Zone further south and making environmental conditions unfavorable for tropical cyclone formation. On October 6, the monsoon trough began to re-establish itself around the 5th parallel north as the ridge receded northward. Although shower activity was initially displaced to the north of the low, the Joint Typhoon Warning Center (JTWC) issued a Tropical Cyclone Formation Alert for the system, on the basis of increased circus outflow. Around this time, the Japan Meteorological Agency (JMA) upgraded the system into a tropical depression. Within 24 hours of the issuance of the TCFA, thunderstorm activity gradually increased in coverage, and the JTWC upgraded the disturbance into a tropical depression at 00:00 UTC on October 10, although post-season analysis from the JTWC indicated that this occurred six hours earlier than operationally estimated. Despite a  displacement between the surface and upper-level circulations, the JTWC upgraded the depression into a tropical storm at 12:00 UTC. Six hours later, the JMA followed suit.

While moving north, the low-and upper-level centers of Kelly became better aligned on October 11, which resulted in strengthening. At 18:00 UTC, Kelly was upgraded into a severe tropical storm by the JMA. Six hours later, the JTWC reported that Kelly attained typhoon intensity. Meanwhile, the Philippine Atmospheric, Geophysical and Astronomical Services Administration (PAGASA) also began to monitor the storm, with the agency assigning it the local name Oniang. At 12:00 UTC on October 12, the JMA followed suit and classified the storm as a typhoon. After maintaining maximum intensity for 72 hours, the storm's forwards motion started to decrease, and on October 15, the typhoon turned to the north-northwest despite being forecast to recruve out to sea in response to a trough located over the Yellow Sea. On October 16, Kelly began to lose tropical characteristics and transition into an extratropical cyclone. Later that day, the storm passed over Shikoku and then made landfall near Kobe while maintaining typhoon intensity. Kelly then emerged into the Sea of Japan, and at 06:00 UTC on October 17, the JTWC declared the system an extratropical cyclone. The JMA did the same six hours later, but continued to track the system through October 19.

Impact
Yanase Dam received  of rain in an hour, the highest hourly rainfall total measured during the storm. A total of 84 domestic flights were cancelled, including 36 flights on 16 routes to and from the Osaka International Airport. Four people died in the prefecture of Tottori when landslides swept their homes. Three other people were killed in Kagawa Prefecture, located on the island of Shikoku, because of flying debris. Offshore, a  freighter, the Eleftheria II, was badly damaged when it slammed onto rocks off the coast of Shikoku, where its 24 crewmen were rescued.

Overall, nine people were killed and seventeen people were wounded. Based on reports from the National Police Agency, Typhoon Kelly caused 452 landslides, demolished 20 bridges, damaged 165 dwellings, and damaged railways in 20 prefectures. Nationwide, 24,044 houses were flooded, 216 homes were destroyed, and additional 30 homes were badly damaged. Damage amounted to $365.6 million.

See also

Typhoon Dinah (1987)

Notes

References

External links

1987 Pacific typhoon season
Typhoons in Japan
1987 in Japan
Typhoons
Kelly